Kramer Hills is an unincorporated community in San Bernardino County, California, United States.

The small mining camp of Kramer Hill was founded around 1885 after a nearby copper discovery, but was short-lived. Later discoveries of gold and copper revived interest, but the only substantial development was at the Herkelrath gold mine around 1926. Actual production (if any) is unknown, but many claims were staked and much prospecting done.

Nearby is the World War II Hawes Auxiliary Airfield.

References

Unincorporated communities in San Bernardino County, California
Unincorporated communities in California